Pottstown may refer to:

Pottstown, an unincorporated area in Peoria County, Illinois, United States
Pottstown, Pennsylvania, United States

See also
Pottsville (disambiguation)